Mohsin al-Harthi (born 17 July 1976) is a Saudi Arabian footballer.

Career
At the club level, Al-Harthi played most of his career for Al-Nasr.

He also played for the Saudi Arabia national football team, and was a participant at the 2002 FIFA World Cup and 1999 FIFA Confederations Cup.

References

1976 births
Saudi Arabian footballers
Saudi Arabia international footballers
1999 FIFA Confederations Cup players
2002 FIFA World Cup players
Living people
Al Nassr FC players
Ohod Club players
Al-Fayha FC players
Association football defenders
Saudi First Division League players
Saudi Professional League players
Saudi Second Division players